Štefanja Gora is a village in the Municipality of Cerklje na Gorenjskem in the Upper Carniola region of Slovenia.

The local church is dedicated to Saint Stephen and was originally built around 1132. The current building dates to 1805, when the entire church was rebuilt after the older one was destroyed by lightning.

References

External links

Štefanja Gora on Geopedia

Populated places in the Municipality of Cerklje na Gorenjskem